Mazen Kerbaj (born Beirut, 1975) is a Lebanese jazz and free improvisation trumpeter and comic book artist.

Kerbaj grew up in Beirut during the Lebanese Civil War, and began playing free jazz in local clubs following the reestablishment of cultural life in the 1990s. His first public performances took place in 2000, started his own record label, and toured internationally, playing with musicians such as Michael Zerang, Mats Gustafsson, Guillermo Gregorio, and Fred Lonberg-Holm in Europe and the United States. He also issued his own comics in the 2000s, which are published on a blog. In July 2006, he recorded himself playing live during the 2006 Lebanon War with the sounds of bombs exploding and car sirens wailing.

In 2015, he became artist-in-residence at the Berlin collective DAAD.

Discography
 A with Sharif Sehnaoui & Raed Yassine cd-thèque, 2003)
 Abu Tarek with Franz Hautzinger (Creative Sources, 2004)
 Rouba3i5 with Christine Sehnaoui, Sharif Sehnaoui & Ingar Zach (Al Maslakh, 2005)
 Brt Vrt Zrt Krt (Al Maslakh, 2005)
 3:1 with Birgit Ulher, Sharif Sehnaou  (Creative Sources, 2008)
 Blue Rain with Ernesto Rodrigues, Guilherme Rodrigues, Carlos Santos (Creative Sources, 2014)
 Ariha Brass Quartet with Axel Dörner, Franz Hautzinger, Carl Ludwig Hübsch (Al Maslakh, 2015)
 Funkhaus with Mike Bullock, Andrew Lafkas (Fine Noise & Light, 2017)
 East of Where? with Toshimaru Nakamura (Ftarri, 2017)
 Sawt Out with Burkhard Beins, Michael Vorfeld (2018)

Bibliography
 Mazen Kerbaj: Beyrouth, juillet–août 2006. L’Association BD
 Mazen Kerbaj, Lenia Major: Suffit la bagarre! Edition Samir, 2012
 Mazen Kerbaj: Lettre à la mère (Arbeitstitel Plus jamais). Ed. Apocalypse, 2013

See also
 Cyril M

References

Lebanese musicians
Jazz trumpeters
1975 births
Living people